Suillus flavogranulatus is a bolete mushroom in the genus Suillus native to North America. It was described as new to science in 1965 by mycologists Alexander H. Smith, Harry Delbert Thiers, and Orson K. Miller.

See also
List of North American boletes

References

External links

flavogranulatus
Fungi described in 1965
Fungi of North America